Jeff McCracken (born September 12, 1952) is an American actor, director and producer.

Early life and education 
Born in Chicago, McCracken graduated Evanston Township High School in 1970. He served in the United States Air Force during the Vietnam War, where he attained the rank of sergeant. McCracken earned a Bachelor of Arts a degree in creative writing from Goddard College.

Career 
After studying at the Neighborhood Playhouse School of the Theatre in New York City he began his acting career on Broadway and off-Broadway, including Breakfast with Les and Bess by Lee Kalcheim. As a member of the Circle Repertory Company he appeared in Confluence by Lanford Wilson, John Bishop and Beth Henley. He also had roles in films, including The One Man Jury (1978), Stranger in Our House (1979), Kent State (1981), Running Brave (1985), and Waiting for the Light (1990).  He appeared in television series, Bay City Blues and Hawaiian Heat, as well as guest starring in other series such as: JAG, thirtysomething, The Hitchhiker, St. Elsewhere, The Torkelsons, All is Forgiven, LAX, and Private Eye.

McCracken developed and co-produced the feature film Quiz Show. He was production executive on Pastime.

While at the Walt Disney Company he developed, produced and directed television shows Boy Meets World; Zoe, Duncan, Jack and Jane; Dinosaurs; and You Wish,  as well as developing and overseeing production of The Torkelsons, Maybe This Time, Misery Loves Company, Where I Live, and Singer and Sons.  In all he has directed over seventy episodes of television, including NYPD Blue, Boy Meets World, Dinosaurs, Zoe, Duncan, Jack and Jane, Still Standing, The Trouble With Normal, Suite Life of Zach and Cody, and Smart Guy.

His artwork has appeared in the magazine The Guide Artists. He taught for several years at Dodge College of Film and Media Arts, becoming an associate professor in 2008, and in 2016 he was a teacher at the New York University Tisch School of the Arts.

Personal life 
McCracken lives in Washington, Connecticut with his wife, Janet Taylor McCracken, who is a food editor. They have three children.

Filmography

Film

Television

References

External links

1952 births
American male film actors
Film producers from Illinois
American male stage actors
American male television actors
American television directors
Television producers from Illinois
Chapman University faculty
Living people
Male actors from Chicago
Evanston Township High School alumni
People from Evanston, Illinois